This is a summary of the electoral history of John Key, Prime Minister of New Zealand (2008–2016), Leader of the National Party (2006–2016), and Member of Parliament for  (2002–2017).

History
Key had first decided to stand for National at the 2002 election in late 2001. He was then working at Merrill Lynch, an investment bank. Key decided to not stand on the list. Beverley Revell—a registered nurse—was Key's campaign manager. Key eventually chose Helensville to contest, against the unfavourably rated Brian Neeson. Many in National feared that Labour would take over the seat, and Key won the nomination 32–28.

The 2005 election showed close results heading in with Don Brash as its leader, with Labour winning 48-50 seatwise, while also having large political party support. Brash later revealed in his autobiography that he never intended to spend a full term as Prime Minister, and would give the position over to Key.

Parliamentary elections

2002 election

2005 election

2008 election

2011 election

2014 election

Notes

References

Key, John